Due sorelle amano is a 1950 Italian romantic drama film directed by Jacopo Comin.

Cast 
 Jone Salinas	as 	Maria Pia
 Eleonora Rossi Drago		as 	 	Marilù, Maria Pia's sister
 Peter Trent		as 		Tom
 Maria Grazia Francia		as 	 	Other sister
 Gaby Morlay		as 	 	Sisters' mother
 Carlo Tamberlani		as 	 	Sisters' father
 Marina Vlady

References

External links 
 

1950 films
Italian black-and-white films
1950s Italian-language films
1950 romantic drama films
Italian multilingual films
1950s multilingual films
Italian romantic drama films
1950s Italian films